Rohan Kriwaczek is an English writer, composer and violinist. He studied under Peter Maxwell Davies, Oliver Knussen and Judith Weir, and has written classical works, scores for theatre, TV, and radio. He worked with Ken Campbell in 1995 on a BBC Radio 3 Studio 3 programme.

He is the author of the 2006 book An Incomplete History of the Art of Funerary Violin, which purports to document this musical genre and contains numerous musical examples in score.

References

External links
 official home page of Rohan Kriwaczek
Uncovering the 'True' History of the Funerary Violin, NPR story October 5, 2006

Living people
English violinists
British male violinists
British clarinetists
Bagpipe players
British male writers
21st-century British writers
20th-century classical composers
21st-century British musicians
21st-century classical composers
British classical composers
British male classical composers
British film score composers
British male film score composers
British people of Austrian descent
Pupils of Peter Maxwell Davies
20th-century English composers
21st-century clarinetists
21st-century violinists
20th-century British male musicians
21st-century British male musicians
Year of birth missing (living people)